Norfolk is a county in England.

Norfolk may also refer to:

Places

Australia 
 Norfolk Island, an Australian external territory

Canada 
 Norfolk, Alberta
 Norfolk (electoral district), Ontario
 Norfolk County, Ontario

New Zealand 
 Norfolk, New Zealand, a locality in Taranaki

United Kingdom 
 Norfolk House, in London
 Norfolk (European Parliament constituency)
 Norfolk (UK Parliament constituency), from 1707 to 1832

United States 
 Norfolk, Colorado
 Norfolk, Connecticut
 Norfolk (CDP), Connecticut, a census-designated place in the town of Norfolk
 Norfolk, Massachusetts
 Norfolk County, Massachusetts
 Norfolk, Mississippi
 Norfolk, Missouri
 Norfolk, Nebraska
 Norfolk (town), New York
 Norfolk (CDP), New York, a hamlet and census-designated place in the town of Norfolk
 Norfolk, Virginia
Downtown Norfolk, Virginia
Naval Station Norfolk, a major U.S. Navy base in Norfolk, Virginia
Norfolk Naval Shipyard, located in nearby Portsmouth, Virginia
 Norfolk County, Virginia, a defunct county of South Hampton Roads, Virginia, USA, created in 1691; location of modern-day Norfolk and Chesapeake

Transportation
HMS Norfolk, six ships in the British Royal Navy
Norfolk (ship) - one of several vessels of that name
Norfolk Air, formerly based on Norfolk Island, Australia
Norfolk International Airport, Norfolk, Virginia
Norfolk (MBTA station) in Norfolk, Massachusetts
Norfolk Southern Railway, an American railroad company
USS Norfolk, any of several U.S. Navy ships
Norfolk station (disambiguation), stations of the name

Animals
Norfolk damselfly, a species particular to the Norfolk Broads in England
Norfolk hawker, a dragonfly
Norfolk Trotter, an extinct horse breed named after the county in England
Norfolk Horn, a rare breed of sheep named after the county in England
Norfolk Grey, a breed of chicken
Norfolk Black, a breed of turkey
Norfolk Terrier, a breed of dog

People
Any of various Dukes of Norfolk
Earl of Norfolk, a title which has been created several times in the Peerage of England
Norfolk Herald Extraordinary, an officer of arms at the College of Arms in London
Lawrence Norfolk (born 1963), British novelist
Peter Norfolk (born 1960), British wheelchair tennis player

Other uses
Norfolk case, a type of luggage
Norfolk dialect, a dialect of Norfolk, England
Norfuk language, spoken in Australia's Norfolk Island
Norfolk jacket, an item of Victorian-era clothing
Norfolk pine, also known as Norfolk Island Pine, a species of tree (Araucaria heterophylla)
Norfolk State University, located in Norfolk, Virginia
Royal Norfolk Regiment, an infantry regiment of the British Army
The Battle of Norfolk, a military engagement during the first Gulf War